The Samoan whistler (Pachycephala flavifrons), also known as the yellow-fronted whistler, is a species of bird in the family Pachycephalidae. It is endemic to Samoa, where found in forest, plantations and gardens.

Taxonomy
The Samoan whistler was originally described in the genus Eopsaltria. It has been previously considered a subspecies of the Australian golden whistler, Pachycephala pectoralis, as P. pectoralis flavifrons.

Description
The Samoan whistler resembles the Australian golden whistler, but the male has blacker upperparts, yellow or white to the forehead, a dull black throat that is strongly mottled with yellow or white, and no black chest-band. The female resembles a duller version of the male with a pale grey throat.

References

Samoan whistler
Birds of Samoa
Samoan whistler
Taxonomy articles created by Polbot
Taxa named by Titian Peale